The Keystone State Wrestling Alliance (KSWA) is a professional wrestling promotion that was founded in Pittsburgh, Pennsylvania in 2000 by Lou Zygmuncik and Shawn Blanchard. KSWA's longtime ring announcer Bobby O purchased the promotion in 2005. It is the only promotion based in Pittsburgh and one of several groups in the Pittsburgh metropolitan area including the International Wrestling Cartel and Pro Wrestling eXpress. It currently operates in the Lawrenceville section of Pittsburgh.

History
The Keystone State Wrestling Alliance was established in Pittsburgh, Pennsylvania by Lou Zygmuncik and Shawn Blanchard in early 2000. Its debut show was held on February 18, 2000, at Peabody High School. The promotion slowly grew in popularity during the next few years. Bill Peduto, the mayor of Pittsburgh, has attended KSWA events. In 2005, the promotion was a feature cover story in both The Front and the Pittsburgh City Paper. Tony Norman of the Pittsburgh Post-Gazette wrote that the KSWA was "one of the purest and most entertaining examples of Americana in Pittsburgh".

In 2013, Pittsburgh Magazine called KSWA's live events one of the city's best tourist attractions in its "Best of the 'Burgh" column. A year later, the promotion was profiled by the Pittsburgh Post-Gazette, the Pittsburgh Tribune-Review, and The Wall Street Journal. In August 2016, CBS Pittsburgh named the KSWA among the best locally based independent promotions along with the International Wrestling Cartel, Pro Wrestling eXpress and Ring of Honor. KSWA's "Brawl Under the Bridge II", an outdoor show which took place underneath Homestead Grays Bridge, was covered by ABC News that summer. On July 22, 2017, Demolition Ax wrestled his last singles match at "Brawl Under the Bridge III".

Birth of the KSWA (2000–2005)
The organization held six more events after its debut and saw the heavyweight title change hand twice between Skippy Hawke and Shawn Blanchard later in the year. Most of these events were in Bloomfield, at the Bloomfield VFW, where their fan base began to build. The promotion expanded its area of influence within the city. On August 26, 2000 the KSWA began running events in Lawrenceville, at the Candlelight Lounge. On August 14, 2004, with an established fan base, KSWA found a home in the Lawrenceville Moose Lodge which was dubbed the "KSWA Arena".

In August 2005, "The Front" was the first media exposure for the organization, which focused on Anthony Alexander's victory over Biker Al for the Golden Triangle Championship. Later the same year, KSWA made its first appearance at Millvale days in September. The previous year, Hurricane Ivan severely flooded and damaged the small community by dumping 11 inches of rain in under 36 hours. Being the first fair post storm, the borough brought the KSWA in for an extra morale boost. WPXI featured parts of a match as part of their rebound coverage; From then on, the KSWA has appeared in Millvale annually in the parade and performing.

In November of the same year, the Pittsburgh City Paper now featured a show, bringing in even more fans the following show in December, which featured "La Lucha" and Justin Sane defeating Del Douglas for the tag team championship. The show continued adding to the now plentiful fan base which was dubbed the "KSWA Krazies" by Ring Announcer Trapper Tom. These "Krazies" began a tradition of donating toys to Allegheny County's "Holiday Project" campaign. This now annual show was dubbed "FanFest", and has brought thousands of toys to needy children in the Pittsburgh metropolitan area.

Modern era (2005–present)
The year 2006 began a turning point for the KSWA. Early in 2006, the City Paper featured the group once again, interviewing several fans. All told the paper how much they enjoyed the show after moving in from other areas. 2006 featured 13 cards, including "Clash Against Cancer" that drew more than 300 people the KSWA Arena to benefit cancer research. Quickly following that, more than 320 fans attended the 2nd Annual FanFest and Toy Drive. Organizers believe that this is the first time in which attendance topped 300 for two consecutive KSWA events.

"Battle Bowl" was introduced in January 2007. The annual Battle Royal event, brings in current and former, as well as surprise participants. Anthony Alexander won this first event, and quickly made the event a staple of the KSWA yearly rotation. During the rest of the 2007 calendar year, KSWA began appearing in more Pittsburgh area venues, Hosting a fundraiser in McKees Rocks and appeared twice at the nearby Obey House Tavern in the Crafton Heights section of the city. Several of the personalities also appeared on the "Humanity Matters" local cable TV show in the City of Pittsburgh. Once again, FanFest broke the KSWA's attendance record and ending in Anthony Alexander winning the Heavyweight Championship.

The KSWA held 14 events in 2008, including, on March 29, the first Joe Abby Memorial Tournament. It was named in honor of "Killer" Joe Abby, a mainstay on Studio Wrestling during the 1960s and 1970s. The Joe Abby Tournament became a way of honoring Pittsburgh's contributions to the pro wrestling industry, and saw Abby and Frank Durso, another Studio Wrestling regular, as the first wrestlers inducted into the KSWA Hall of Fame. Blanchard, with Durso in his corner, defeated Kris Kash in the finals of the inaugural Joe Abby Tournament. That same year, the KSWA begin its association with the Lawrenceville Community's yearly “Fireworks Celebration” at Arsenal Park. On December 6, 2008, Demolition Ax was brought in by the KSWA for its third annual FanFest supercard. In the main event, Ax and Kris Kash defeated "VIP" members Blanchard and Martin. In January 2009, the first sweepstakes was held during the "Battle Bowl". Shawn Blanchard was the winner and received a shot at the World title and will remain the reward for a few years. In March 2009, Demolition Ax made his KSWA return at the second annual Joe Abby Tournament. He was admitted as the third member of the KSWA Hall of Fame by owner Bobby O, however, Ax later lost his match against Shawn Blanchard later in the night.

On July 3, KSWA was invited back to the Lawrenceville Fireworks Celebration. "The Latin Assassin" took home $5,000 in a "Winner Take All" Battle Royal and Lord Zoltan made his debut in the KSWA ring. Zoltan, a long-time Pittsburgh-area independent wrestler, became one of the KSWA's biggest assets. The following day, the group traveled to Lake Latonka in Mercer County, PA. The event ended with Kris Kash chasing Lou Martin into the lake. In September, a fundraiser was held in the Ross Township Community Center. Called "Drop Kick Diabetes," the event raised funds for a Diabetic sufferer who had his legs amputated due to the disease. A then-record 406 fans attended the successful fundraiser. An undisclosed amount of money was raised for the man, but with the Chinese Auction and admission, it is estimated to be as much as 14,000 dollars.

Another first for regulars occurred in October, when the KSWA debuted in the "Teamster Temple", on Butler Street in the Lawrenceville neighborhood. This time the group was there to help raise funds for the St John Neuman's Catholic School. Which would be a taste of events to come. The same month, Demolition Ax re-appeared with his Demolition partner, Smash, to face off against the reigning Tag Team Champions, Lou Martin and Shawn Blanchard. They won the match, but unable to return, relinquished the titles the next event. The match was featured in Pro Wrestling Illustrated.

At FanFest, on December 5, 2009, Dominic DeNucci wrestled Frank Durso in DeNucci's first KSWA appearance. This match was later realized to have featured the two oldest participants professional wrestling history, and was enjoyed by fans of Pittsburgh's Studio Wrestling. DeNucci and Durso would again wrestle against each other in March 2010, as part of a six-man tag team match at the Joe Abby Memorial Tournament. The tournament also saw female wrestler Donna Christianello inducted into the Hall of Fame; Christianello died a slightly over a year later from complications of COPD. At the same show, then city councilman Bill Peduto declared March 27, 2010 to be "KSWA Day in the City of Pittsburgh."

In May 2010, the KSWA experimented with a series of internet TV shows but chose not to pursue the concept any further. On July 31, the group traveled to Monongahela, Pennsylvania for a fundraiser benefiting a local football organization. Later in 2012 they did the same for the Guyasuta youth football team and cheerleading association in Sharpsburg, PA. On November 6, 2010, the KSWA partnered with the Sharpsburg Volunteer Fire Department as a fundraiser. It eventually evolved into an annual event called the "Mario Ferraro Sr. Memorial Tournament". In the tag team main event of this tournament, titleholders Kris Kash and Shane Starr were accompanied to the ring by the manager of champions J. J. Dillon. However, as is customary for Dillon, the leader of The Four Horsemen, he turned on his team and hit one in the head with his loafer, then watched as Blanchard and Martin won the tag team championship.

During the March 26, 2011 Joe Abby Memorial Tournament, the KSWA inducted Bobby “Hurricane” Hunt and Ron Romano into the Hall of Fame. Before this event, Hunt had been the subject of a feature story in the “New Pittsburgh Courier.” In July of the same year, the KSWA would travel to Plum Borough for the town's annual Community Festival at Larry Mills Park. They were again invited in 2012, but did not perform due to inclement weather.

On December 3, an estimated 500-plus fans visited the KSWA Arena, nearing the building's permissible capacity to see a glimpse of George "The Animal" Steele. Tony Norman, columnist for the Pittsburgh Post-Gazette, appeared as a guest ring announcer along with Lanny Frattare. The Post-Gazette included an article written by Norman, detailing his experience. Earlier in the day, KSWA owners and wrestlers attended a roast of Dominic DeNucci in Greentree, PA as his induction into the Professional Wrestling Hall of Fame was announced, then in Amsterdam, New York. City Councilman Bill Peduto proclaimed December 3, 2011 as "Dominic DeNucci Day" in the City of Pittsburgh with an emotional bond to Studio Wrestling and his grandfather. Later that night, several attendees to the roast appeared at Fan Fest; Including DeNucci, Irish Davey O'Hannon, "Pretty Boy" Larry Sharpe, and Cody Michaels. "The Battman" Tony Marino made an appearance as well, restarting Lord Zoltan and Justin Sane's team "Party Gras" match, causing them to remain the KSWA tag team champions. Pittsburgh Police reported to the KSWA that an estimated 250 fans were turned away due to the Occupational Ordinance. Civil Air Patrol's Color Guard presented the Colors for the National Anthem.

During the show of November 17, 2012, KSWA held its first fundraiser for Connecting Communities. This organization provides assistance to mentally disabled persons. They would later hold a second fundraiser.

December 8, 2012, during the annual FanFest, Bruno Sammartino inducted into the Hall of Fame by owner Bobby O. A few months later, Sammartino was also inducted into the WWE Hall of Fame in Madison Square Garden. Sammartino attended the event along with his friend, Domenic DeNucci, where a record setting attendance of 523 fans was recorded.

Tommy Faime, a KSWA "Original", was the first alumnus to be inducted, which occurred at the Joe Abby Tournament in 2013.

Prior to KSWA's "Summertime Bruise" 2013, Pittsburgh Magazine wrote an article featuring the upcoming show about their atmosphere. Later in the year, they would also be featured in the "Best of Pittsburgh" for "Best Place To Stand Around With a PBR."

On March 26, 2016, at the 9th annual Joe Abby Memorial Tournament, the KSWA held its 200th event. On September 10, 2016, U.S. Senator Pat Toomey presented the promoters with a special certificate recognizing the KSWA as the "longest-running professional wrestling organization in the city's history". It was similarly honored by Governor Tom Wolf.

Covid-19

After the February 22, 2020 match, all subsequent KSWA events were cancelled, due to the COVID-19 pandemic, and Governor Tom Wolf's executive shut down order. Outdoor events resumed on May 14, 2021.

Charity work
The promotion has long been involved with both Pittsburgh-based and international charity organizations. KSWA typically runs 15 shows for charity each year. Its shows have raised money for cystic fibrosis research, volunteer fire departments and local food banks. KSWA's year-end "Fan Fest" supercard, co-hosted by the Allegheny Holiday Project, is held for local children as a holiday toy drive and has collected an estimated 7,500 toys since 2005. Another annual event, "Brawl Under the Bridge", was started in the summer of 2015 as a benefit show for children in Allegheny County.

Roster

Wrestlers

Managers and valets

Referees

Other on-air personnel

Alumni

Both active and former members are listed under the "All Time K.S.W.A Megastar Roster" on the KSWA website. HOF indicates Hall of Fame.

 Anita Bush
 Anthony Alexander 
 Alex Arcadian
 Angie Minelli (HOF)
 Brett Paradise
 Bob Thomas
 Billy Rich
 Bosco Baracus
 BC Steele
 Blue Bat
 Bobby O
 Biker Al  
 Billy Glander 
 “Big” Bubba Balbowski
 Bobby Badfingers
 Bobby “Hurricane” Hunt (HOF)
 “Bushwhacker” Luke Williams
 Bruno Sammartino (HOF)
 “Big Bully” Busick (HOF)
 Bill Apter (HOF)
 Baron Mikel Scicluna (HOF)
 BROhemoth (Ian Taylor, debuted 2017)
 Bubba The Bulldog
 Brian Hildebrand (HOF)
 Cousin Elmer
 Chopper Davidson
 Cobra
 Chasity
 Chaos
 Cody Michaels (HOF)
 “Chilly Billy” Bill Cardille (HOF)
 “Cannonball” Chuck Martoni (HOF)
 Curt Wootton (Pittsburgh Dad)
 Cleveland Bruiser
 "Dr. Devastation" Lou Martin (Lou Zygmuncik)
 Devil Bhudakahn
 "Drunken Luchadore" Joey Quervo
 D’Licious
 Dave Diamond
 Demolition Ax (HOF)
 Donna Christantello (HOF)
 Demolition Smash
 Dominic DeNucci (HOF)
 Doink The Clown
 Dave Marbell
 Dennis Gregory
 Eric "The Electric" Love
 Eric Extasy
 Edric Everhart
 El Skeletorious
 Eugene Palermo (HOF)
 Frank Durso (HOF)
 Frank Holtz (HOF)
 "Flying" Ryan Burke 
 "Gentleman" Joe Perri 
 "Gorgeous" Greg Wallace
 George "The Animal" Steele (HOF)
 Gino Slice
 Howard Kernats (HOF)
 Harley T. Morris
 "Hacksaw" Jim Duggan
 Hillbilly Jim
 "Iceman" Tony Johnson
 “Irish” Davey O’Hannon
 Ice Machine 
 Justin Sane
 Justin Idol
 Jake Garrett
 JT Rodgers
 Jameson T. Samson 
 Joe Abby (HOF)
 J Ru
 J. J. Dillon (HOF)
 Jack Massacre
 Jonny Axx
 Jay Flash (debuted 2010)
 "Jumpin" Johnny DeFazio (HOF)
 Kingdom James
 Kaida (also Ali Kaida)
 Kris Kash
 La Lucha
 Latin Assassin
 Lord Zoltan (HOF)
 Larry Zbyszko
 Lanny Frattare (HOF)
 “Luscious” Johnny Valiant (HOF)
 Lucio Deveer
 Michael Blade
 Mike Malachi
 Mantis
 Mad Mike
 ”Midevil” Mike Wrath
 Mercedes
 “Mr. Puniverse” Bob Atlas
 Midnight Biker 
 Mike Buda
 ”Mr. 8x10” Michael Cruz
 Manic 
 Mitch Napier 
 Mayor Mystery
 MV Young
 Marcus Knight
 “Nasty” Nick Crane
 “Night Train” Wes Fetty
 Nikolai Volkoff
 "Officer" Dan Murphy
 "Pretty Boy" Larry Sharpe
 Paul Jordane
 Pie Traynor (HOF)
 QB Blitzz
 ”Ring Announcer” Hank Hudson
 “Referee” Donald Brasher
 ”Referee” Kevin Weeks
 “Referee” Chris Kakapalis
 “Referee” Harold Potter
 “Ring Announcer” Michelle Cox
 “Referee” Dick Wigglesworth
 “Ring Announcer” Michael Lysy
 "Ring Announcer" Trapper Tom
 “Referee” Matthew Calamare
 “Referee” Shawn Patrick (HOF)
 ”Ring Announcer” Adam Montgomery
 "Referee" Jimmy James
 Ric Rumskey 
 "Referee" Justin Smith
 "Referee" Dave Fedor 
 Ron Romano (HOF)
 “Referee” Bucky Palmero (HOF)
 Ricky “The Dragon” Steamboat
 “Referee” Adam Jugan 
 Remy Levay
 "Referee" Trick McSorley 
 Ricky Morton
 Robert Gibson 
 Skippy Hawke
 Shawn Blanchard 
 Soul Fighter
 Shaun Adams
 Shane O’Shea
 Selest
 Super Hentai
 Shirley Doe
 Shadow Strike
 Star
 Sam “The Hammer” Slej
 Sheik Mohammed Abu
 Shane Starr
 Sara Brooks
 Sam Squatch 
 Super Ginger
 Sniper
 Stan Squatch 
 Sheriff Steele / Preston Steele
 Sylvester Scarpone
 Tommy Faime
 The Great Toyota
 “The Misfit” Jeff Lockhart
 The Kazmanian Devil
 The Black Scorpion
 "The King" Del Douglas
 "The Natural" Terry Van Horn
 “The Snake Man” Deven Michaels  
 TJ Phillips
 The Blood Beast
 The Asian Persuasion
 “The Revoultionist” Jamie Blaze
 Tyler Cross
 The Bulldozer
 The Jester
 "The Battman" Tony Marino
 Tommy Horror
 The Honky Tonk Man
 T Rantula
 "The Gavel" David Lawless, Esq.
 Tito Santana
 Veronica Von Irons
 Vince Viper
 Van Hughes
 Vinnie Stone
 YINZA
 Zero
 Zach Gowen
 Zak Hunter

Other guests

 Shane Douglas
 Bill Peduto

Stables and tag teams

Events

Joe Abby Memorial Tournament

The Joe Abby Memorial Tournament is an annual professional wrestling single-elimination tournament produced by the Keystone State Wrestling Alliance (KSWA) promotion, which has been held since 2008. It was briefly held as a tag team tournament from 2012 to 2013 and as a four-man tag team tournament from 2015 to 2016. It is held in memory of "Killer" Joe Abby, a Studio Wrestling star during the 1970s, who died from a heart attack on November 14, 1996.

Mario Ferraro Sr. Memorial Tournament
The Mario Ferraro Sr. Memorial Tournament is an annual professional wrestling single-elimination tournament produced by the Keystone State Wrestling Alliance (KSWA) promotion, which has been held since 2013. It is held in memory of Mario Ferraro Sr., a local Pittsburgh wrestling fan, who died on July 9, 2013.

Fan Fest

Every December, KSWA holds its annual "Fan Fest". Comparable to the larger organization WWE's WrestleMania, it draws their largest crowd and many championship opportunities and feuds build to this event. The event has Chinese auction raffles, giveaways, and a visit usually, a visit from Santa Claus. This event also hosts "big ticket names," and routinely draws more than 500 people. Fan Fest, which is co-hosted by the Allegheny Holiday Project, is held for local children as a holiday toy drive and has collected an estimated 7,500 toys since 2005.

Millvale Days

Every September, the KSWA has been invited to Millvale Days, a community street fair held on Grant Street for a weekend. The KSWA performs Friday and Saturday nights on the street, drawing large crowds every time due to the high risk of performing on the streets. The second day, usually a Saturday, ends in a "Battle Royal" where the winner is crowned "The King of Millvale". Wrestler "The King" Del Douglas is the self-proclaimed "King of Millvale" after being the reigning champion of the event for several years since KSWA's first appearance at the fair.

Brawl Under the Bridge
Starting in 2015, the KSWA has been invited to Homestead to participate in their street fair, which features the ring set up under the Homestead Grays Bridge, generating the name "Brawl Under the Bridge". The event was featured in a spot on ABC News by Michael Koenigs as he cycled across America. Wrestler Nikolai Volkoff, who began his professional wrestling career in Pittsburgh as a "Mongol," sang "God Bless America" before the event, was interviewed by Koenigs, was a featured guest.

In 2017, Bill Eadie (Demolition Ax) wrestled in his last match as a single's competitor, against KSWA mainstay Shawn Blanchard. The contest was for the "Brawl Under The Bridge" championship. Eadie received a proclamation from Governor Tom Wolf, recognizing his career, and Demolition Ax won the "Brawl Under The Bridge" Championship.

KSWA Hall of Fame
The KSWA Hall of Fame is an American professional wrestling hall of fame maintained by the Pittsburgh-based promotion Keystone State Wrestling Alliance (KSWA). It was established in 2008 to honor wrestlers who have wrestled for the promotion and select wrestling personalities who have made significant contributions to professional wrestling in Pittsburgh and the Northeastern United States. The KSWA Hall of Fame has become the de facto "Pittsburgh Pro Wrestling Hall of Fame."

Inductees

Championships

Current championships
The KSWA currently has four regular Championship Titles and one annual title.

Former championships

Sources

References

External links

KSWA Digest
Keystone State Wrestling Alliance on Wrestlingdata.com

 
American independent professional wrestling promotions based in Pennsylvania
2000 establishments in Pennsylvania
Entertainment companies established in 2000